Jishuitan may refer to:

Beijing Jishuitan Hospital, in Beijing, China
Jishuitan station, station on Line 2 & Line 19, Beijing Subway